Erling Munthe-Dahl was a Norwegian officer who was most notable as Jagervingen's commander at Fornebu Airport during the Norwegian campaign in 1940.

Biography

Family
Erling Munthe-Dahl was the son of Jens Munthe-Dahl and Hanna Andersen. His father was a major in the Army's engineering weapons. Munthe-Dahl's first place of residence was Building 2, Kristiania.

Military Career before World War II
Erling Munthe-Dahl graduated in Autumn, 1915. He later graduated from the Norwegian Military Academy's upper department in 1918, and was then appointed first lieutenant in the Engineering Weapons. After this he was an inspection officer on the War School's engineering line. In 1921, Munthe-Dahl started at the Military College. From 1922 to 1926 he was ordered as head of the Northern Norway Aviation Department. In 1921, Munthe-Dahl started at the Military College. From 1922 to 1926 he was ordered as head of the Northern Norway Aviation Department, and he also took a military college degree in 1923.

With a special interest in radio communication, he graduated from the Royal Norwegian Navy's 's " radio course" in 1924 with a 1st class certificate. In 1925, he graduated from the Supélec in France. After this, Munthe-Dahl became head teacher at the Army Flight School in 1926, and at the same time the Air Force's signal consultant. He held these positions until 1930. On July 1, 1932, Captain Munthe-Dahl was ordered as the first commander of the newly established Garrison Swing, in the Air Battalion. Munthe-Dahl had also served in several French air regiments.

The first article he wrote for the Norwegian Air Military Journal (NLMT) was published in 1926, on the subject of electrical installations in aircraft. The article used material from the French journal l'Aeroneutique as a source. Munthe-Dahl took over the editorial responsibility for NLMT in 1928 and wrote much of the content himself. Main topics had technical and tactical content.

From 1937 to 1939 was Munthe-Dahl Chief of Staff of the Army Air Force, and he was appointed chief of Jager Wing at Fornebu on October 20, 1939. Starring reason for the appointment was Munthe-Dahl's treatise "Oslo's air defenses confronted with a modern air attack. » He received the Norsk Militært Tidsskrift's silver medal for this dissertation.

World War II
Captain Munthe-Dahl was Jagervingen's commander at Fornebu Airport during Nazi Germany's surprise attack on Norway between April 8 and 9 in 1940. Jagervingen's efforts delayed the development of the attack on Norway.

Prisoner of War
On January 24, 1942, Munthe-Dahl was arrested at the Grini detention camp, and held there as a prisoner until February 5, 1942. He was then transferred to the German camps Schokken, Grune, Oflag XXI-C and finally Luckenwalde, all the time with being labeled as prisoner number 29. He was a prisoner of war until the end of the peace in 1945.

Career after World War II
After World War II, Munthe-Dahl continued in the Royal Norwegian Air Force. From January 1, 1949, to January 1, 1952, Munthe-Dahl was chief adjutant to King Haakon VII. He ended his career in the Armed Forces in 1962, as Major General and Commander of Luftkommando Vestlandet (LKV), in the headquarters at Sola.

References

1897 births
1996 deaths
Norwegian aviators
Norwegian military personnel of World War II
Norwegian prisoners of war in World War II
Military personnel from Oslo